Marko Jakšić (born 6 March 1987) is a Serbian football defender.

References

External links
 
 Marko Jakšić profile at mojklub.rs
 Marko Jakšić stats at utakmica.rs 
 

1987 births
Living people
Sportspeople from Karlovac
Association football defenders
Serbian footballers
FK Mladost Apatin players
FK Inđija players
FK Bežanija players
FK Jedinstvo Užice players
FK ČSK Čelarevo players
Serbian First League players
Serbian SuperLiga players